lmctfy ("Let Me Contain That For You", pronounced "l-m-c-t-fi") is an implementation of an operating system–level virtualization, which is based on the Linux kernel's cgroups functionality.

It provides similar functionality to other container-related Linux tools such as Docker and LXC. Lmctfy is the release of Google's container tools and is free and open-source software subject to the terms of Apache License version 2.0.

The maintainers in May 2015 stated their effort to merge their concepts and abstractions into Docker's underlying library libcontainer and thus stopped active development of lmctfy.

References

External links

 Presentation slides from initial release announcement
 Project website
 Project "README" file providing overview
 Google Groups post providing in depth comparison with the LXC tools

Linux-only free software
Virtualization software for Linux